Ottomar is a masculine given name of Germanic origin.
It is derived from Audamar, a name comprised from the elements *aud, meaning wealth, and *mari, meaning fame. Other variant of the name is Othmar. 

The name may refer fo:

Ottomar Anschütz (1846–1907), German inventor, photographer, and chronophotographer
Ottomar Gern (1827–1882), Russian fortification engineer
Ottomar Rodolphe Vlad Dracula Prince Kretzulesco (1940–2007), German socialite
Ottomar Ladva (born 1997), Estonian chess player
Ottomar von Mayenburg (1865–1932), German pharmacist
Ottomar Pinto (1931–2007), Brazilian politician
Ottomar Rosenbach (1851–1907), German physician
Hermann Ottomar Herzog (1832–1932), German-American painter
Julius Rudolph Ottomar Freiherr von Minutoli (1804–1860), Prussian chief of police, diplomat, scientist, and author
Paolo Ottomar Malchiodi (1970 - ) Italian triathlete

See also
Othmar
Omar (name) 
Otto

Masculine given names
German masculine given names